Pauline Kumeroa Kingi  (born 3 May 1951 in Napier, New Zealand) is a Māori community leader.

Biography
Pauline Kingi received an LL.M. from Harvard and was admitted as a barrister and solicitor in 1980 and is also a corporate director, with membership of both the Institute of Directors and the New Zealand Institute of Management. Her extensive community and public sector involvement has spanned over 28 years.

She is a past chancellor of the Auckland University of Technology and lodged the application for AIT to become the first University of Technology in New Zealand, and is credited as being a key contributor in the making of AUT. In June 2004, she was elected to the New Zealand Institute of Management, Auckland Division, and is the first Māori to be appointed to this body.

In 1993, Kingi was awarded the New Zealand Suffrage Centennial Medal, and in the 1999 New Year Honours, she was appointed a Companion of the New Zealand Order of Merit, for services to the community. In 2000, she was selected for an inaugural Manawahine Award, from the Māori Women’s Welfare League, and received this Award from Te Arikinui, Dame Te Atairangikaahu. She is currently working in Te Puni Kōkiri as the Regional Director for Auckland, the largest region in New Zealand under one director.

References

External links
A Way Forward for Aotearoa New Zealand

1951 births
Living people
New Zealand women in business
New Zealand public servants
Harvard Law School alumni
Companions of the New Zealand Order of Merit
People from Napier, New Zealand
New Zealand Māori lawyers
Recipients of the New Zealand Suffrage Centennial Medal 1993
New Zealand Māori women lawyers